= Bert Ives =

English footballer (1908–1980)

Personal information
- Full name: Albert Edward Ives
- Date of birth: 18 December 1908
- Place of birth: Newcastle, England
- Date of death: 1980 (aged 71–72)
- Height: 5 ft 7 in (1.70 m)
- Position: Full-back

Youth career
- 1929–1930: Spen Black & White

Senior career*
Years	Team	Apps	(Gls)
1930–1936	Sunderland	12	(0)
1936–1938	Barnsley	9	(0)
1938–19??	Blyth Spartans		
- * Club domestic league appearances and goals

Albert Edward Ives (18 December 1908 – 1980) was an English professional footballer who played as a full-back for Sunderland.
